The European Prize in Combinatorics is a prize for research in combinatorics, a mathematical discipline, which is awarded biennially at Eurocomb, the European conference on combinatorics, graph theory, and applications.  The prize was first awarded at Eurocomb 2003 in Prague.  Recipients must not be older than 35.  The most recent prize was awarded at Eurocomb 2021 in Barcelona (Online).

 2003 Daniela Kühn, Deryk Osthus, Alain Plagne
 2005 Dmitry Feichtner-Kozlov
 2007 Gilles Schaeffer
 2009 Peter Keevash, Balázs Szegedy
 2011 David Conlon, Daniel Kráľ
 2013 Wojciech Samotij, Tom Sanders
 2015 Karim Adiprasito, Zdeněk Dvořák, Rob Morris
 2017 Christian Reiher, Maryna Viazovska
 2019 Richard Montgomery and Alexey Pokrovskiy
 2021 Péter Pál Pach, Julian Sahasrabudhe, Lisa Sauermann, István Tomon

See also

 List of mathematics awards

References

Early career awards
European science and technology awards
Mathematics awards